Stadtbergen (Swabian: Staberga) is a town in the district of Augsburg, in Bavaria, Germany. Stadtbergen was granted town privileges in May 2007.

Mayors 
 Ludwig Fink (SPD): 1992-2011
 Paul Metz (CSU): since October 2011

Local council
The town council has 24 seats. The elections in 2014 showed the following results:
 CSU: 11 seats
 SPD: 7 seats
 Freie Wähler (Free voters): 1 seat
 PRO Stadtbergen: 2 seats
 Alliance '90/The Greens: 3 seats

References

Augsburg (district)